The 1949–50 Hovedserien was the 6th completed season of top division football in Norway.

Overview
It was contested by 16 teams, and Fram Larvik won the championship.

Teams and locations
''Note: Table lists in alphabetical order.

League tables

Group A

Group B

Results

Group A

Group B

Championship final
Fredrikstad FK 1–1 Fram Larvik
Fram Larvik 1–0 Fredrikstad FK

References
Norway – List of final tables (RSSSF)

Eliteserien seasons
Norway
1
1